Jorge Darío Cáceres Ovelar (born 26 January 1998) is a Paraguayan professional footballer who plays as a left-back for Ferro Carril Oeste, on loan from Lanús.

Career
After arriving in Argentina from Paraguay with his father in 2008, Cáceres soon joined San Lorenzo's youth ranks which preceded Lanús signing him in 2013. Cáceres remained in their system for five years, notably featuring for the U20s at the 2016 U-20 Copa Libertadores, before being promoted into the Argentine Primera División club's first-team during the 2017–18 campaign. Having been an unused substitute versus Racing Club on 16 February 2018, Cáceres eventually made his professional debut a week later against Rosario Central. Three subsequent appearances followed.

On 3 January 2020, Cáceres returned to Paraguay and joined River Plate on a one-year loan with no option to buy. On 1 February 2021, he was then loaned out to Alvarado until the end of 2021. For the 2022 season, he was loaned out to Ferro Carril Oeste.

Career statistics
.

References

External links

1998 births
Living people
People from Paraguarí Department
Paraguayan footballers
Association football defenders
Paraguayan expatriate footballers
Argentine Primera División players
Paraguayan Primera División players
Primera Nacional players
Club Atlético Lanús footballers
River Plate (Asunción) footballers
Club Atlético Alvarado players
Ferro Carril Oeste footballers
Expatriate footballers in Argentina
Paraguayan expatriate sportspeople in Argentina